Lost Creek is a stream in Wayne County in the U.S. state of Missouri. It is a tributary of the St. Francis River.

The stream headwaters occur at the confluence of the West Fork Lost Creek and East Fork Lost Creek at  currently within Lake Wappapello and the confluence with the St. Francis River is at  also within Lake Wapapello.

Lost Creek was so named either due to its status as a losing stream or due to a pioneer incident in which a man became lost near its course.

See also
List of rivers of Missouri

References

Rivers of Wayne County, Missouri
Rivers of Missouri